Arpita Singh (née Dutta; born 22 June 1937) is an Indian artist. Known to be a figurative artist and a modernist, her canvases have both a story line and a carnival of images arranged in a curiously subversive manner. Her artistic approach can be described as an expedition without destination. Her work reflects her background. She brings her inner vision of emotions to the art inspired by her own background and what she sees around the society that mainly affects women. Her works also include traditional Indian art forms and aesthetics, like miniaturist painting and different forms of folk art, employing them in her work regularly.

Personal life
Arpita was born on 22 June 1937 in Baranagar, Bengal Presidency (now West Bengal). She left the city with her mother and brother in 1946, a year before India got its independence from the British rule in 1947. In 1962, she married fellow artist Paramjit Singh and they had a daughter, artist Anjum Singh. Currently she lives in Nizamuddin East, New Delhi.

Education 
Arpita attended the Delhi Polytechnic in New Delhi from 1954–59 and graduated with a Diploma in Fine Arts.

Career
After her graduation, Arpita Singh worked at the Weavers' Service Centre, Ministry of Textiles, Government of India in New Delhi and experienced the textiles industry closely. Her stint as a textile designer reflects in her work. The Talwar Gallery showcased her works in their first ever exhibition, 'Tying Down', dedicated to Arpita Singh in 2017.

She took on a job with the Cottage Industries Restoration Program, a body of the Government of India. While she worked in the program, she met traditional artists and weavers of India. This is said to have impacted her artwork too.

Arpita Singh has significant contributions through a different social and political awareness. She was a founder member of the artists' group 'The Unknown', along with other alumni of the Department of Fine Arts of Delhi Polytechnic in the 1960s. The first group show of 'The Unknown' was held at IENS Building (now INS Building) at Rafi Marg, New Delhi in 1962.

First exhibition 
Arpita Singh's first exhibition was held at Kunika Chemould Gallery, organised by Roshan Alkazi, New Delhi in 1972.

Exhibitions thereafter 
Post 1972, Arpita Singh extensively showed her work at Royal Academy of Arts at London (1982), the Centre Georges Pompiduo, Paris (1986), show in Geneva (1987) and at the Art Gallery of New South Wales Sydney (1993). She has also participated in the 3rd and 4th Trienniale of New Delhi & at the Havana Biennial in 1987 and the Indo-Greek Cultural Exhibition, in Greece, 1984. 

From 1987-89, Arpita organised and participated in the exhibition titled 'Through The Looking Glass' with her contemporaries, the women artists Nalini Malani, Nilima Sheikh, and Madhvi Parekh. The exhibition, featuring works by all four artists, travelled to five non-commercial venues across India. Inspired by a meeting in 1979 with Nancy Spero, May Stevens and Ana Mendieta at the AIR Gallery in New York (the first all-female artists’ cooperative gallery in the US), Malani had planned to organise an exhibition entirely of works by women artists, which failed to materialise due to a lack of interest and support.

Her works have been exhibited at ‘Modern and Contemporary Indian Art’ at Vadehra Art Gallery, New Delhi, 2006; 'Progressive to Altermodern: 62 Years of Indian Modern Art' at Grosvenor Gallery, London, 2009; 'Kalpana: Figurative Art in India' presented by the Indian Council for Cultural Relations (ICCR) at Aicon Gallery, London, 2009; 'The Root of Everything' at Gallery Mementos, Bangalore, 2009.

Her recent and select solo exhibitions include Work on Paper at Vadehra Art Gallery, 2016.

Singh's work was included in the 2022 exhibition Women Painting Women at the Modern Art Museum of Fort Worth.

Style 
Arpita Singh's early paintings were mainly water colors on paper. She would paint usually in black and white ink.

By the 80s, she started to paint Bengali folk paintings with women as the focus. She would use vibrant colors in a rather restrained way and her palette is usually dominated by pinks and blues. Her paintings would show women doing daily work and following simple routines in their lives. Arpita would draw daily use objects like trees, flowers, flower vases, animals, teapots, pillows, festoons and flags, and show women surrounded by them. Child Bride with Swan (1985) and Girl Smoking Cigarette (1985) are examples of her protagonists, leading uncomplicated lives and deaths.

In the 90s, Arpita's style of painting shifted to oil on canvas, but she continued to paint women-centric art. A lot of women emotions started to become evident in her paintings - Joy, sorrow, hope, and many more. She painted a series of paintings on the subject "Women with a Girl Child" in the last decade of 20th century. Arpita would showcase the problems like hatred, social injustice, etc. faced by a contemporary woman in her art. She would also paint around the ills related to girl child in India. In some of her paintings the women appear nude, but her paintings do not have sexual overtones and reflect the woman's vulnerability.

Arpita's paintings spoke a lot about wars and situation of turmoil at the national and international level. She would draw objects like guns, knives, cars and planes, soldiers, killers and corpses. India's former Prime Minister Indira Gandhi's assassination, the anti-Sikh riots of 1984, communal riots and the Gulf War are some examples. Women would continue to find the center stage in her art and are shown at the receiving end. The White Chair (1983), The series on Ayesha Kidwai, Durga (1993), My Mother (1993) and A Dead Man on the Street: is It You, Krishna (1994) are some of her paintings echoing this mood.

Reception

Awards 
Arpita Singh has exhibited all over the world, at both individual and group exhibits. She has also won a number of awards for her work. Those include:

 2014 - Fellowship of Lalit Kala Akademi
 2011 - Padma Bhushan
 1998-1999: Kalidas Samman, Bhopal
 1991 - Parishad Samman, Sahitya Kala Parishad, New Delhi

List of exhibitions 
Arpita Singh has more than twenty solo shows to her credit including several in Chandigarh, Bhopal, Mumbai and New Delhi. They include:

 2019  Submergence: In the midst of here and there, at KNMA, Saket, Delhi
 2018  Tying down time II, Talwar Gallery, New York
 2017  Tying down time, Talwar Gallery, New York
 2006  Picture Postcard 2003 – 2006, Vadehra Art Gallery, New Delhi  
 2003 Memory Jars, Bose Pacia Modern, New York 
 1994  Drawing 94, Gallery Espace, New Delhi

Publications
2018: Arpita Singh: Tying down time, Talwar Gallery

References

External links

Arpita Singh at Artnet.com
Arpita Singh at 
Arpita Singh at 
Arpita Singh at the Benezit Dictionary of Artists
Arpita Singh: Of stories untold, The Hindu Businessline
How a brief interlude of abstract art transformed the career of the legendary Arpita Singh, Scroll.in

1937 births
Living people
Bengali people
Indian women contemporary artists
Indian contemporary painters
Painters from West Bengal
Recipients of the Padma Bhushan in arts
Indian women painters
Women artists from West Bengal
20th-century Indian painters
20th-century Indian women artists
21st-century Indian women artists
Fellows of the Lalit Kala Akademi